Bangla Naache Bhangra is a 2013 Indian Bengali film directed by Nandini and produced by Nitesh Sharma under the banner of Bangala Talkies. The film is slated to release on 23 August 2013.

Cast 
 Sayan Ganguly as Raj
 Pallavi Biyani as Simran
 Rajesh Sharma
 Biswajit Chakraborty
 Partho Sarathi Chakraborty
 Kharaj Mukherjee
 Reshmi Sen
 Lakhwinder Singh
 Amitabh Gupta

Soundtrack 

Soundtrack of Bangla Naache Bhangra has been composed by Rishi Chanda, Arindam Chatterjee, Raja Narayan Deb and Raga Boyz. Lyrics are penned by Prasen.

The background score has been done by Ambar Das.

References 

Bengali-language Indian films
2010s Bengali-language films
2013 films
Films scored by Arindam Chatterjee
Films scored by Raja Narayan Deb
Films scored by Rishi Chanda
Films scored by Raga Boyz